The Sweden men's national water polo team is the representative for Sweden in international men's water polo. The team has participated in eight tournaments at the Summer Olympics.

Results

Olympic Games

1908 —  Bronze medal
1912 —  Silver medal
1920 —  Bronze medal
1924 — 4th place
1936 — 7th place
1948 — 5th place
1952 — 11th place
1980 — 11th place

See also
 Sweden men's Olympic water polo team records and statistics

References

Men's national water polo teams
 
Men's sport in Sweden